"Guillotine IV (The Final Chapter)" is the second single from Falling in Reverse's third album Just Like You. It is the fourth and final installment of the Guillotine series that was started by Ronnie Radke when he was the frontman of Escape the Fate. Ronnie Radke sang the first song, "The Guillotine", from Escape the Fate's Dying Is Your Latest Fashion; and Craig Mabbit sang "This War Is Ours (The Guillotine II)" and "The Aftermath (The Guillotine III)" from Escape the Fate's This War Is Ours and their self-titled album, respectively.

Personnel
Falling in Reverse
 Ronnie Radke – lead vocals
 Jacky Vincent – lead guitar, backing vocals
 Derek Jones – rhythm guitar, backing vocals
 Ryan Seaman – drums, percussion, backing vocals

Additional
 Charles Kallaghan Massabo – bass

References 

2015 singles
Falling in Reverse songs
2015 songs
Epitaph Records singles
Songs written by Ronnie Radke
Song recordings produced by Michael Baskette